Opisthosiphon is a genus of land snails with an operculum, terrestrial gastropod mollusks in the family Pomatiidae.

Description 
The genus Opisthosiphon has been described by American malacologist William Healey Dall in 1905. Dall's type description reads as follows:

Species 
Species within the genus Opisthosiphon include:
 Opisthosiphon aguilerianum (Arango, 1876)
 Opisthosiphon alleni Bartsch, 1946
 Opisthosiphon andrewsi Welch, 1929
 Opisthosiphon androsensis Pilsbry, 1930
 Opisthosiphon apertum Torre & Henderson, 1920
 Opisthosiphon bacillum Torre & Bartsch, 1941
 Opisthosiphon bahamense (Sh.) - type species, as Chondropoma bahamense Sh.
 Opisthosiphon banaoense Torre & Henderson, 1921
 Opisthosiphon bermudezi Torre & Bartsch, 1941
 Opisthosiphon berryi Clapp, 1919
 Opisthosiphon bioscai Torre & Henderson, 1920
 Opisthosiphon caguanense Torre & Bartsch, 1941
 Opisthosiphon caroli Aguayo, 1932
 Opisthosiphon claudens Torre & Bartsch, 1941
 Opisthosiphon cucullatum Torre & Bartsch, 1941
 Opisthosiphon cunaguae Welch, 1929
 Opisthosiphon detectum Torre & Henderson, 1920
 Opisthosiphon deviatum Torre & Bartsch, 1941
 Opisthosiphon echinatum (Gundlach in Pfeiffer, 1857)
 Opisthosiphon evanidum Torre & Henderson, 1921
 Opisthosiphon greenfieldi Torre & Bartsch, 1941
 Opisthosiphon guanajaense Torre & Bartsch, 1941
 Opisthosiphon insularum Torre & Bartsch, 1941
 Opisthosiphon judasense Torre & Henderson, 1920
 Opisthosiphon lamellosum Torre & Bartsch, 1941
 Opisthosiphon litorale Torre & Bartsch, 1941
 Opisthosiphon manatiense Torre & Bartsch, 1941
 Opisthosiphon mayori Bartsch, 1946
 Opisthosiphon millsi Bartsch, 1946
 Opisthosiphon moreletianum (Petit, 1850)
 Opisthosiphon nicholasi Bartsch, 1946
 Opisthosiphon obtectum Torre & Henderson, 1920
 Opisthosiphon obturatum Torre & Henderson, 1920
 Opisthosiphon palmeri Torre & Bartsch, 1941
 Opisthosiphon paredonense Torre & Henderson, 1920
 Opisthosiphon plateroense Torre & Bartsch, 1941
 Opisthosiphon plicatum Torre & Bartsch, 1941
 Opisthosiphon poeyi Torre & Bartsch, 1941
 Opisthosiphon prominulum Torre & Bartsch, 1941
 Opisthosiphon protactum Torre & Henderson, 1920
 Opisthosiphon pupoides (Morelet, 1849)
 Opisthosiphon quesadai Aguayo, 1932
 Opisthosiphon quinti Torre & Bartsch, 1941
 Opisthosiphon sabinalense Sánchez Roig, 1949
 Opisthosiphon sainzi Aguayo, 1934
 Opisthosiphon salustii Torre & Henderson, 1920
 Opisthosiphon sanchezi Torre & Bartsch, 1941
 Opisthosiphon sculptum (Gundlach in Pfeiffer, 1857)
 Opisthosiphon sosai Torre & Bartsch, 1941
 Opisthosiphon subobtectum Torre & Bartsch, 1941
 Opisthosiphon subobturatum Torre & Henderson, 1920
 Opisthosiphon tersum Torre & Henderson, 1921
 Opisthosiphon thesaurus Watters, 2019
 Opisthosiphon torrei Welch, 1929
 Opisthosiphon turiguanoense Torre & Bartsch, 1941
 Opistosiphon conicus Aguayo & Sánchez Roig, 1949

References 
This article incorporates public domain text from the reference 
 Dall, W.H. (1905). An arrangement of the American Cyclostomatidae, with a revision of the nomenclature. Proceedings of the Malacological Society of London, 6(4): 208-210.
 Bank, R. A. (2017). Classification of the Recent terrestrial Gastropoda of the World. Last update: July 16th, 2017.

Pomatiidae
Taxa named by William Healey Dall